Robert M. Wegner is a Polish fantasy writer, winner of Janusz A. Zajdel Award in 2009 for his short story We All are Meekhanees (pol. Wszyscy jesteśmy Meekhańczykami) and Sfinks Award in 2010 for short-story The Best You Can Buy (pol. Najlepsze, jakie można kupić).

He made his debut in 2002 in Science Fiction magazine with short-story The Last Flight of Night Cowboy (pol. Ostatni lot Nocnego Kowboja). In 2009 and 2010, he published two collections of short stories called Tales from Meekhanese Border (pol. Opowieści z meekhańskiego pogranicza). Both were released by Powergraph.

References 

Polish fantasy writers
Living people
Year of birth missing (living people)